Johnsonina eriomma is a species of spikefish found in the Caribbean Sea in the waters around Cuba and Trinidad and Tobago. This species is the only known member of its genus.

References

Tetraodontiformes
Taxa named by George S. Myers
Fish described in 1934